Zhamila Bakbergenova (born 6 January 1996) is a Kazakhstani freestyle wrestler. She is a two-time silver medalist in the women's 72kg event at the World Wrestling Championships. She is a four-time medalist, including two gold medals, at the Asian Wrestling Championships. She is also a two-time medalist at the Islamic Solidarity Games.

Career 

She won the silver medal in the 69 kg event at the 2017 Islamic Solidarity Games held in Baku, Azerbaijan. In the final, she was defeated by Elis Manolova of Azerbaijan.

She competed in the 68 kg event at the 2018 Asian Games without winning a medal; she was eliminated from the competition in her first match by Ayana Gempei of Japan. In 2019, she won a bronze medal in the women's 72 kg event at the Asian Wrestling Championships held in Xi'an, China. In that same year, at the World Wrestling Championships held in Nur-Sultan, Kazakhstan, she lost her bronze medal match against Masako Furuichi in the women's freestyle 72 kg event.

In 2020, at the Golden Grand Prix Ivan Yarygin held in Krasnoyarsk, Russia, she won the silver medal in the women's 72 kg event. She won the gold medal in the 72 kg event at the Asian Wrestling Championships held in New Delhi, India.

In 2021, she won the silver medal in her event at the Asian Wrestling Championships held in Almaty, Kazakhstan. In April and May 2021, she competed at the Asian Olympic Qualification Tournament and the World Olympic Qualification Tournament respectively, hoping to qualify for the 2020 Summer Olympics in Tokyo, Japan. In June 2021, she won the bronze medal in her event at the 2021 Poland Open held in Warsaw, Poland. In October 2021, she won the silver medal in the 72 kg event at the World Wrestling Championships in Oslo, Norway.

In 2022, she won the gold medal in the 72 kg event at the Yasar Dogu Tournament held in Istanbul, Turkey. She won the gold medal in her event at the 2022 Asian Wrestling Championships held in Ulaanbaatar, Mongolia. She won one of the bronze medals in the 72 kg event at the 2021 Islamic Solidarity Games held in Konya, Turkey. She defeated Anta Sambou of Senegal in her bronze medal match.

She won the silver medal in the 72kg event at the 2022 World Wrestling Championships held in Belgrade, Serbia.

Achievements

References

External links 

 

Living people
1996 births
Place of birth missing (living people)
Kazakhstani female sport wrestlers
Wrestlers at the 2018 Asian Games
Asian Games competitors for Kazakhstan
Asian Wrestling Championships medalists
Islamic Solidarity Games medalists in wrestling
Islamic Solidarity Games competitors for Kazakhstan
World Wrestling Championships medalists
21st-century Kazakhstani women